The MG7 is a mid-size sports sedan that was built by MG Motor between 2007 and 2013, derived from its British predecessors, Rover 75 and MG ZT to suit Chinese manufacturing and sales. The name was resurrected in 2022 with the launch of the second generation MG7.



First generation (2007-2013)

Production started in March 2007. The MG7 received praise from British car magazine Auto Express, who test drove it in May 2008, although it has not officially been sold in the United Kingdom.

The MG7 came in two variants, the first which resembles the Mark I MG ZT, with twin front lights, and the second which resembles the Mark II Rover 75 V8. A long wheelbase version, called the MG7L, features the deeper radiator grille of the Rover 75 V8.

The MG7 came in two trim levels: 'Classic' which features a slatted grille, and 'Sport' with a mesh grille. The look of the 7 has changed very little from the ZT and 75; the only noticeable difference is freshly designed LED rear light clusters, and new alloy wheels. Also the car features new audio and heating systems, as well as a new sunroof system. 

There were two engine options, the 1.8T and the 2.5 V6, both revised Rover K-Series engines called the N-Series, with stronger head gaskets, both meeting strict Euro IV emissions regulations. Changes to the electrical system have been made to improve the engine's ignition system and also to support the wider range of equipment, which includes front headrest mounted DVD players for rear passengers, and a reversing camera.

One of the greatest improvements is the replacement of some features, which were snatched away under Rover's Project Drive. These include bonnet insulation, driver's side grab handles and the noise, vibration, harshness package which reduces road, engine and wind noise in the cabin dramatically. All models now receive ITS head air bags.

Second generation (2023)

The second generation MG 7 was unveiled in August 2022 with a teaser campaign during July. 

The MG 7 is a fastback sports saloon and is expected to only be sold in China and make use of the new Black Label  designation. 

References 

7
2010s cars
Cars introduced in 2007
Executive cars